This article details the fixtures and results of the Indonesia national football team and Indonesia national under-23 football team in 2011.

Men's senior team

Record

Managers of 2011

Goal scorers

Fixtures and results

Friendly matches 

 1 Non FIFA 'A' international match
 2 Indonesia fielded a selection team of senior and U-23 players on the match versus Los Angeles Galaxy. The U-23 coach, Rahmad Darmawan was appointed to coach the selection team.

2014 FIFA World Cup Qualification

Second round

Third round

Men's under-23 team

Record

Managers of 2011

Goal scorers

Fixtures and results

Friendly matches 

 1 Non FIFA 'A' international match

2012 AFC Men's Pre-Olympic Tournament

Preliminary round 1

2011 Southeast Asian Games

Group stage

Semi-finals

Final

References

2011
2010–11 in Indonesian football
2011–12 in Indonesian football
Indonesia